CFRB (1010 kHz) is a commercial AM radio station in Toronto, Ontario, Canada. It is owned by Bell Media and carries a News/Talk radio format. Its studios and offices are in the Entertainment District at 250 Richmond Street West.

One of the oldest surviving radio stations active in Toronto, CFRB went on the air on February 19, 1927 as 9RB owned by Edward S. Rogers Sr., with the callsign derived from its parent Rogers Vacuum Tube Company and the station moved to its current 1010 AM frequency in 1948. Throughout ownership changes for most of the decade and its format remained intact, the station was acquired by Slaight Broadcasting in 1985, before being acquired by Astral Media in 2007 and ultimately sold to Bell Canada, rival company of Rogers Communications, founded by Rogers Sr.'s son, Ted Rogers, Jr., in 2013.

CFRB is a clear channel station powered at 50,000 watts, the maximum permitted in Canada. While it is a Class A station, it also must protect CBR Calgary, which shares Class A status on 1010 AM. CFRB uses a four-tower array directional antenna in the Clarkson neighbourhood of Mississauga. CFRB is simulcast on shortwave station CFRX at 6.07 MHz in the 49 metre band and on sister station 99.9 CKFM-FM-HD2, a digital subchannel. CFRB is also heard across Canada on Bell Satellite TV channel 964.

History

Early years 
It is not Toronto's very first radio station, but it is the city's oldest broadcaster still operating today. It was founded by the Rogers Vacuum Tube Company. The station was used to promote Edward S. Rogers Sr.'s invention of a batteryless radio receiver that could be operated using alternating current and therefore did not need the cumbersome battery that had previously been required. The station itself was a demonstration of Rogers' application of his invention to radio transmitters as well as receivers, a development that allowed for a signal that reproduced voices and music more clearly. The new type of transmitter also made CFRB the world's first all-electric radio station. The letters "RB" in the station's callsign stand for "Rogers' Batteryless".

The station began transmitting on an experimental basis in January 1927 as 9RB, before being converted to commercial operation a few weeks later, as CFRB.  Those call letters have been used continuously since then.  On February 19, the inaugural broadcast was a live symphony orchestra concert conducted by Jack Arthur. During its first years, CFRB leased time to two phantom stations: CNRX, owned by Canadian National Railways and providing programs of Canada's first radio network, and CPRY, owned by the CNR's rival, the Canadian Pacific Railway. The CNR's network was discontinued in 1933, with many of its assets eventually passing to the Canadian Broadcasting Corporation (CBC), and the CPR's radio service was discontinued in 1935.

CFRB's first studios were in a mansion on Jarvis Street north of Wellesley Street, built by the family of Hart Massey. In 1929, the station moved to purpose-built studios at 37 Bloor Street West. In the same year, the station became a network affiliate of the Columbia Broadcasting System.

In 1932, CFRB began airing the General Motors Hockey Broadcast, which had originated on the CNR's network. This program eventually became Hockey Night in Canada, and continued to be aired by CFRB for many years, despite also airing on the CBC's flagship station CBL, and continues to this day on CBC Television and Rogers Sportsnet.

From the 1930s to the 1950s, CFRB was the radio broadcaster for the Toronto Santa Claus Parade.

In 1937, CFRB began to simulcast on shortwave station CFRX at 6070 kHz.

Following the sudden death of Edward S. Rogers, Sr. in 1939, Rogers Majestic Corporation Limited was sold in 1941 and became Standard Radio Limited. In turn, the company was acquired by Argus Corporation in 1946.

On November 1, 1946, Wally Crouter joined CFRB. He eventually became its morning drive time host, a position he would hold until his retirement on November 1, 1996, after exactly fifty years at the station.

Changing frequencies and studios 
CFRB and CJBC, owned by the CBC, made a frequency switch on September 1, 1948. CFRB moved to 1010 while CJBC took over the Class I-A clear-channel frequency at 860, previously used by CFRB. The CBC wanted its stations in major cities to be on Class I-A frequencies. But CFRB, which had been running at 20,000 watts, was boosted to 50,000 watts, giving it wide coverage over Southern Ontario.

Beginning in 1948, through until the early 1970's, CFRB made several unsuccessful bids for a licence to operate a television station in Toronto.

In 1965, CFRB moved its studios from 37 Bloor Street West to 2 St. Clair Avenue West (at Yonge Street). At around the same time, Standard Radio Limited was renamed Standard Broadcasting.

A long-lasting show, Calling All Britons featuring news, sports scores and music from Britain, began in 1965. It was hosted by Ray Sonin until his death in 1991.

New ownership 
In 1978, Argus Corporation was acquired by Conrad Black and his brother Montegu, thus also giving them ownership of Standard Broadcasting. In November 1985, Slaight Broadcasting acquired Standard from the Blacks. In October 2007, Slaight sold Standard to Astral Media.

Ted Rogers, the communications mogul and son of CFRB's founder, had vowed to re-acquire the station that his family had lost after his father's death, and considered his failure to do so his greatest disappointment. Reports indicate that he continued to attempt to re-acquire CFRB right up until his death in December 2008.

In July 2013, with a buyout of Astral Media, CFRB was acquired by Bell Media, a subsidiary of Bell Canada which already owns the CTV Television Network and rival competitor to Rogers Communications founded by Ted Rogers. Shortly after the purchase, Bell announced that it would move the studios and offices of CFRB and sister station CKFM-FM from their long-time location at St. Clair Avenue and Yonge Street, to 250 Richmond Street West at Richmond and Duncan (which already houses the operations of sister radio stations, CHUM and CHUM-FM).  The building is adjacent to 299 Queen Street West located at Queen Street and John Street (which already houses the operations of several Bell Media specialty television channels including CP24 and MuchMusic). The move took place on May 10, 2014.

Transmitter 
The transmitting antennas for CFRB are a prominent landmark along Lake Ontario, a four-tower array in the Clarkson neighbourhood of Mississauga. The towers are visible from over 100 km away. They are used as a landmark for navigation by pilots, on approach to Toronto Pearson International Airport, or to Toronto Island Airport. The antenna array consists of four vertical masts, 168 metres (550 feet) in height.

CFRB was one of few stations to broadcast in AM stereo, starting in 1984. However, since AM stereo never achieved wide acceptance, the station deactivated its stereo broadcasting system in the mid-1990s.

The transmitter is located on Royal Windsor Drive, 200 meters west of the intersection of Lakeshore Road West (former King's Highway 2) and Southdown Road, at the coordinates .

Shortwave relay 

CFRX is the international shortwave relay of CFRB. It transmits with a power of 1 kW on 6.07 MHz in the 49-meter shortwave band. CFRX signed on the air on February 11, 1937, 10 years after CFRB began. It is operated on the north end of the same site as CFRB's main transmitter building.

The shortwave signal was originally directed to the northwest in order to provide service towards northern Ontario and western Canada. When a new transmitter was installed in the 2000s, it was made non-directional with the intention of providing availability to Canadians travelling to or vacationing in the United States, particularly snowbirds.

Programming 
CFRB has local hosts most of the day, though several shows are syndicated to other Bell Media talk stations in Canada. CFRB airs The Late Showgram With Jim Richards overnights. The 11 p.m. newscast is simulcast from co-owned CFTO-DT Channel 9 CTV Toronto.

CFRB's morning show has trailed CBC Radio One's Metro Morning since 2003.

In August 2009, CFRB announced it was laying off a number of its well-known personalities, including Michael Coren, Paul and Carol Mott, Christina Cherneskey, Jacqui Delaney and newscaster Kris McCusker as part of a move to open a "new chapter" at the station.

The second phase of the shake up was announced in the fall with John Moore moving from afternoon drive to morning, replacing Bill Carroll, who moved to the 9 am to 1 pm slot. Jim Richards took over the 1pm to 4pm slot formerly held by The Motts and Michael Coren and former Ontario Progressive Conservative leader John Tory (later mayor of Toronto) took over the late afternoon slot vacated by Moore. In 2010, Carroll left CFRB to take a job in Los Angeles and was replaced by Jerry Agar.

In early 2013, the station added Astral's new late night Humble & Fred show.

Josh Matlow started on CFRB contributing to Sundays with John Downs and then began hosting his own show, The City (beginning in August 2011) every Sunday on CFRB between 1-3PM. Matlow discussed city hall's top headlines with Toronto's city councillors and the week's news makers. From February 2012 until November 2013, CFRB aired The City, featuring Toronto Mayor Rob Ford and his brother and city councillor Doug Ford. The Ford brothers' version of the show was often controversial and was allegedly used by the Fords as a platform to attack their political enemies, prompting various complaints. The show was cancelled in November 2013 after Mayor Ford admitted using crack cocaine after several months of denials. The Fords were replaced in their time slot by Mark Towhey who had previously been Mayor Ford's Chief of Staff until he was fired by Ford on May 23, 2013 at the height of Ford's crack video scandal. Towhey's show continued until 2021.

In 2016, Tim Hudak, the former leader of the Ontario Progressive Conservative Party, was given a show on Sundays which he hosted until 2021.

In February 2021, Bell Media eliminated 210 positions at its media properties across Canada. Included in the layoffs were Newstalk 1010 news director Kym Geddes, and several broadcasters including weekend host Ted Woloshyn, Nightside host Barb DiGiulio, news reporters and anchors Hayley Cooper, David McKee, Lucas Meyer, and Claude Feig.

References

External links 

CFRB History – Canadian Communications Foundation
 official CFRX website
 History of CFRX-SW – Canadian Communications Foundation

Radio stations established in 1927
Frb
Frb
Frb
1927 establishments in Ontario
CNR Radio
Clear-channel radio stations